Diego Daniel Bustos (born April 28, 1974, in Casilda) is a former Argentine football forward who spent most of his career in Argentina.

In 1995, Bustos had a brief spell with Mexican Primera División side Veracruz.

References

 Primera División statistics

1974 births
Living people
Argentine footballers
Association football forwards
Club Atlético Platense footballers
C.D. Veracruz footballers
Ferro Carril Oeste footballers
FC Nantes players
Argentinos Juniors footballers
Club Atlético Lanús footballers
Talleres de Córdoba footballers
Quilmes Atlético Club footballers
C.S. Emelec footballers
Argentine Primera División players
Ligue 1 players
Liga MX players
Argentine expatriate footballers
Expatriate footballers in Ecuador
Expatriate footballers in Mexico
Expatriate footballers in France
People from Casilda
Sportspeople from Santa Fe Province